The Bradford Hill criteria, otherwise known as Hill's criteria for causation, are a group of nine principles that can be useful in establishing epidemiologic evidence of a causal relationship between a presumed cause and an observed effect and have been widely used in public health research. They were established in 1965 by the English epidemiologist Sir Austin Bradford Hill.

In 1996, Fredricks and Relman remarked on Hill's criteria in their seminal paper on microbial pathogenesis.

Definition
In 1965, the English statistician Sir Austin Bradford Hill proposed a set of nine criteria to provide epidemiologic evidence of a causal relationship between a presumed cause and an observed effect. (For example, he demonstrated the connection between cigarette smoking and lung cancer.) The list of the criteria is as follows:
 Strength (effect size): A small association does not mean that there is not a causal effect, though the larger the association, the more likely that it is causal.
 Consistency (reproducibility): Consistent findings observed by different persons in different places with different samples strengthens the likelihood of an effect.
 Specificity: Causation is likely if there is a very specific population at a specific site and disease with no other likely explanation. The more specific an association between a factor and an effect is, the bigger the probability of a causal relationship.
 Temporality: The effect has to occur after the cause (and if there is an expected delay between the cause and expected effect, then the effect must occur after that delay).
 Biological gradient (dose–response relationship): Greater exposure should generally lead to greater incidence of the effect. However, in some cases, the mere presence of the factor can trigger the effect. In other cases, an inverse proportion is observed: greater exposure leads to lower incidence.
 Plausibility: A plausible mechanism between cause and effect is helpful (but Hill noted that knowledge of the mechanism is limited by current knowledge).
 Coherence: Coherence between epidemiological and laboratory findings increases the likelihood of an effect. However, Hill noted that "lack of such [laboratory] evidence cannot nullify the epidemiological effect on associations".
 Experiment: "Occasionally it is possible to appeal to experimental evidence".
 Analogy: The use of analogies or similarities between the observed association and any other associations.

Some authors consider, also, Reversibility: If the cause is deleted then the effect should disappear as well.

Debate in epidemiology

Bradford Hill's criteria had been widely accepted as useful guidelines for investigating causality in epidemiological studies but their value has been questioned because they have become somewhat outdated. 

In addition, their method of application is debated. Some proposed options how to apply them include:
 Using a counterfactual consideration as the basis for applying each criterion. 
 Subdividing them into three categories: direct, mechanistic and parallel evidence, expected to complement each other. This operational reformulation of the criteria has been recently proposed in the context of evidence-based medicine.
 Considering confounding factors and bias.
 Using Hill’s criteria as a guide, but not considering them to give definitive conclusions.
 Separating causal association and interventions, because interventions in public health are more complex than can be evaluated by use of Hill’s criteria

An argument against the use of Bradford Hill criteria as exclusive considerations in proving causality is that the basic mechanism of proving causality is not in applying specific criteria—whether those of Bradford Hill or counterfactual argument—but in scientific common sense deduction. Others argue that the specific study from which data has been produced is important, and while the Bradford Hill criteria may be applied to test causality in these scenarios, the study type may rule out deducing or inducing causality, and the criteria are only of use in inferring the best explanation of this data.

Debate over the scope of application of the criteria includes, whether they can be applied to social sciences. The argument proposes that there are different motives behind defining causality; the Bradford Hill criteria applied to complex systems such as health sciences are useful in prediction models where a consequence is sought; explanation models as to why causation occurred are deduced less easily from Bradford Hill criteria because the instigation of causation, rather than the consequence, is needed for these models.

Examples of application
Researchers have applied Hill’s criteria for causality in examining the evidence in several areas of epidemiology, including connections between ultraviolet B radiation, vitamin D and cancer, vitamin D and pregnancy and neonatal outcomes, alcohol and cardiovascular disease outcomes, infections and risk of stroke, nutrition and biomarkers related to disease outcomes, foods and nutrients related to cardiovascular disease and diabetes and sugar-sweetened beverage consumption and the prevalence of obesity and obesity-related diseases. They have also been used in non-human epidemiological studies, such as on the effects of neonicotinoid pesticides on honey bees. Their use in quality improvement of health care services has been proposed, highlighting how quality improvement methods can be used to provide evidence for the criteria.

Since the description of the criteria, many methods to systematically evaluate the evidence supporting a causal relationship have been published, for example the five evidence-grading criteria of the World Cancer Research Fund (Convincing; Probable; Limited evidence – suggestive; Limited evidence – no conclusion; Substantial effect on risk unlikely).

See also

References

Epidemiology
Diseases and disorders
Causality